Skegoneill Avenue is a football stadium in Belfast, Northern Ireland. It is the home of Brantwood F.C., has a capacity of 5,100 and was built in 1952. It is located on the street of the same name, a residential road linking the Antrim and Shore roads.

References

External links
 

Association football venues in Northern Ireland
Sports venues in Belfast
Sports venues completed in 1952
Brantwood F.C.